U with ring above (У̊ у̊)is a letter of the Cyrillic script.

It is the 32nd letter of the Shughni language between ӯ and Ф. Sometimes the digraph уo is used instead.

Computing codes 
This letter is not a precomposed character. It needs to be composed as У+◌̊.

References